People's Guard can mean:
 Gwardia Ludowa, a communist armed organisation in Poland during World War II, organised by the Soviet-created Polish Workers Party
 People's Guard (Libya), part of Muammar Gaddafi's regime in Libya
 People's Guard of Georgia, a volunteer force of Georgian civilians who resisted the Red Army invasion in February 1921.
 Volkswehr, a former name for the Austrian Armed Forces